Erskine LaVerne Jay (March 3, 1885 – August 17, 1970) was an American football and baseball coach. He served as the head football coach (1916–1917) and head baseball (1916–1917) coach at Western Illinois State Normal School (now known as Western Illinois University). He was also on the school's faculty as an instructor in geography and physical training.

References

External links
 

1885 births
1970 deaths
People from Beetown, Wisconsin
Baseball coaches from Wisconsin
Coaches of American football from Wisconsin
Western Illinois Leathernecks baseball coaches
Western Illinois Leathernecks football coaches